Alessandro Covre (date of birth unknown, died 1951) was an Italian wrestler, who competed in the lightweight event at the 1912 Summer Olympics.

References

External links
 

Year of birth missing
1951 deaths
Olympic wrestlers of Italy
Wrestlers at the 1912 Summer Olympics
Italian male sport wrestlers
Sportspeople from Verona